Janusz Grzemowski (20 June 1947 – 10 November 2005) was a Polish luger. He competed in the men's singles event at the 1972 Winter Olympics.

References

1947 births
2005 deaths
Polish male lugers
Olympic lugers of Poland
Lugers at the 1972 Winter Olympics
People from Bielawa